Rapid response team may refer to:

 Rapid response team (medicine), an emergency medical team to act quickly to save lives
 Rapid response team (resistance movement), a network of safe houses to hide undocumented aliens